= Carolin Scharpff-Striebich =

Carolin Scharpff-Striebich (15 August 1963 – 28 August 2026) was a German cultural manager and art collector.
